Lenton Methodist Church is a  Methodist church on Derby Road in Lenton, Nottingham.

History
Lenton Methodist Church was opened in 1914 and was designed by local architect Albert Edward Lambert. The cost of construction was £4,500 and it had seating for 450 worshippers, and 300 children in the attached schoolroom.

In the early 21st century, the church hall was adapted for use by God's Vineyard Church.

Organ
The pipe organ by Charles Lloyd was transferred here in 1939 by E. Wragg & Son from Crocus Street Hall. A specification of the organ can be found on the National Pipe Organ Register.

References

Methodist churches in Nottingham
Churches completed in 1914
Former Methodist churches in the United Kingdom
Albert Edward Lambert buildings